Linjab Sharif (also Romanized as Līnjāb Sharīf; also known as Līnjāb, Līnjāv Sharīf, and Venīt Sharīf) is a village in Nabovat Rural District, in the Central District of Eyvan County, Ilam Province, Iran. At the 2006 census, its population was 60, in 13 families. The village is populated by Kurds.

References 

Populated places in Eyvan County
Kurdish settlements in Ilam Province